The State Theatre opened in 1984 and is part of the Arts Centre Melbourne located by the Yarra River and St Kilda Road. Like the other performance venues within the Arts Centre, the State Theatre is underground. It has over 2,000 seats and its stage is one of the largest in the world.

The State Theatre is typically used as a venue for ballet, opera and musical theatre.

The first opera in the State Theatre was the John Copley production of Verdi's Don Carlos in 1984 by the Victoria State Opera.

Opera Australia and The Australian Ballet each use the State Theatre as their main Melbourne venue. It is also used by The Production Company for short seasons of musical theatre.

Over summer, the State Theatre usually hosts a major musical or large-scale theatre production. Notable summer productions have included The Life and Adventures of Nicholas Nickleby, My Fair Lady, The King and I, Joseph and the Amazing Technicolor Dreamcoat, Hello, Dolly!, H.M.S. Pinafore, Dusty, War Horse, Dream Lover and Evita.

Gallery

See also
List of theatres in Melbourne

References

External links
State Theatre page at The Arts Centre website

Tourist attractions in Melbourne
Theatres in Melbourne
Concert halls in Australia
Opera houses in Australia
Theatres completed in 1984
1984 establishments in Australia
Music venues in Melbourne
Music venues completed in 1984
Buildings and structures in the City of Melbourne (LGA)